Spilapteroidea is an extinct superfamily of palaeodictyopterans.

References 

Prehistoric insect taxa
Palaeodictyopteroidea